The Roman Town House in Dorchester is a Roman ruin within Colliton Park, Dorchester, Dorset. Dorset County Council acquired Colliton Park in 1933 as the site for the construction of County Hall. The Town House was discovered in 1937/38 during an archaeological investigation carried out by the Dorset Natural History and Archaeological Society prior to the construction of the new building. Plans for County Hall were modified so that the Town House could be retained on site.

The Town House is a scheduled ancient monument and a Grade I listed building. It is bounded on the north and west sides by North Walk and West Walk which are also scheduled monuments having the remains of the Roman ramparts of the town just below surface level.

Built around 307 AD and extended in 341 AD, the Town House has two principal ranges of rooms. The South Range comprising rooms 1–7 survives in the plan form of flint and stone walls on the grass covered site. The West Range comprising rooms 8–18 was mosaic floored. This range was re-excavated and provided with a steel and glass cover building with a stone tiled roof all perched on the original foundations between 1996 and 1999.

See also
Durnovaria

References

External links

 Official website or the Roman Town House
 website
 Take a virtual tour of the Roman Town House Dorchester

307
Houses completed in the 4th century
Buildings and structures in Dorchester, Dorset
Roman Dorchester
Grade I listed buildings in Dorset
Scheduled monuments in Dorset
Tourist attractions in Dorset